PRH can refer to:
 Partido Revolucionario Hondureño (Honduran Revolutionary Party (1961-1993)
 Penguin Random House, a publishing company
 Penrhyndeudraeth railway station, Gwynedd, Wales (National Rail station code)
 Fictional People's Republic of Haven in the "Honorverse" novels of David Weber
 Princess Royal Hospital (disambiguation), the names of separate hospitals in Bromley, Haywards Heath and Telford
 Phrae Airport, the IATA code PRH